Saudi Founding Day, officially the Founding Day, is a public holiday in Saudi Arabia celebrated annually on February 22 to commemorate the enthronement of Muhammad bin Saud as the emir of the oasis town of Diriyah in 1727 following the death of his father Saud al-Muqrin, the eponymous ancestor of the al-Saud family. His hereditary succession is considered as the prelude to the inception of the First Saudi State, the antecedent to the Second Saudi State and present-day Kingdom of Saudi Arabia. It was founded in 2022 on its 295th anniversary when King Salman issued a royal decree that designated it as a legal holiday to be observed as per the Gregorian calendar. It is one of the three non-religious national holidays observed in the country, other being the Saudi National Day and Saudi Flag Day.

History and background 
The death of Saud bin Muhammad al-Muqrin in around 1726 paved the way for his son, Muhammad to succeed him as the emir of Diriyah in Najd. His hereditary succession to his father's throne is considered to be the inceptive point for the birth of the Emirate of Diriyah, otherwise known as the First Saudi State. In 1744, he forged an alliance with Muhammad bin Abdul Wahhab, a reformist Sunni Islamic scholar who sought asylum following expulsion from his hometown of Uyayna due to his perceived devious teachings. Ibn Wahhab would later turn out to be the spiritual muse of the embryonic emirate and his teachings serving as an exuberant force for future conquests and expeditions of the Arabian Peninsula by successive imams of the First Saudi State in the name of reviving theological monotheism and eradicating conceived innovative deviant beliefs amongst Muslims. The conquests would last until 1818 when the Ottoman Egyptian army led by Muhammad Ali Pasha and Ibrahim Pasha launched a retaliatory offensive into Najd, pressing hard and subsequently laying siege to Diriyah and vanquishing the First Saudi State in the process. 

However, almost six years later in 1824, Turki bin Abdullah al-Saud would retake Diriyah and Riyadh and restore the Saudi rule by driving the Ottoman Egyptian forces out of Najd and establishing the Second Saudi State. The polity would go on to exist for 67 years until 1891 when the Hai'l based Rashidi tribe deposed the al-Saud dynasty and sent its last leader, Abdul Rahman bin Faisal al-Saud and his family to exile.  

Almost ten years later in 1901, Ibn Saud, the son of the exiled emir Abdul Rahman al-Saud, embarked on a raiding spree into Nejd where he began targeting tribes associated with the Rashidis in an attempt to avenge his father's exile. Within months, he was able to capture Riyadh in January 1902 and subsequently establish the Emirate of Riyadh. Ibn Saud would go on to reclaim the territories of his ancestors, launching offensives into Hasa in 1913, Ha'il in 1921, Hejaz in 1924 and Yemen in 1934 as part of his unification campaigns and establishing several iterations of the Third Saudi State. In 1932, he renamed his annexes and dependencies by unifying them under the name of Saudi Arabia with Riyadh at its capital. 

In 1965, King Faisal issued a royal decree that instructed government institutions to observe 23 September as Saudi National Day, the first such non-religious holiday to be observed in the country. In 2005, King Abdullah declared 23 September as a public holiday despite criticism from religious clerics.  

Following the rise of Mohammed bin Salman as the country's crown prince in 2017, the country underwent unprecedented reforms that saw taming the authority and influence of religious clerics. In January 2022, King Salman issued a royal decree that made 22 February a public holiday to commemorate the approximate anniversary of Muhammad bin Saud's succession to his father's throne in 1727, making it the second non-religious holiday in Saudi Arabia.

Royal Decree No. A/371 
On January 27, 2022, the Saudi Press Agency reported that King Salman issued a royal decree that read:

Celebrations

2022 
On 22 February 2022, as per the King Salman's royal decree, the Saudi government and its institutions observed the first celebrations of Founding Day across the country. Holidays were declared for employees in public and private sectors as festivities took place for three days until 25 February 2022 and students in the country saw their weekends extended up to 26 February 2022 by the education ministry. 

The Washington-based Arab Gulf States Institute in Washington published an article titled The Saudi “Founding Day” and the Death of Wahhabism by Sultan Alamer in which he highlighted that reason to select 1727 instead of 1744 was to signify the current Saudi leadership's distancing from Wahhabism since the rise of Mohammed bin Salman and breaking the myth and narrative that the First Saudi State was born out of a covenant made between Muhammad ibn Abd al-Wahhab and Muhammad bin Saud in 1744. As per Kristin Diwan, senior resident scholar at the Arab Gulf States Institute, said that "Mohammed ibn Abd al-Wahhab is being erased from Saudi history". She further added, "This is the new Saudi nationalism. It celebrates the Al Saud - tying the people directly to the royal family - and downplays the pivotal role played by religion in the founding of the state".

2023 
The Saudi authorities observed the celebrations of Founding Day on 22 February 2023. Holidays were declared for employees in public and private sector. Celebrations kicked-off with a night air-show performed by the Saudi Hawks in Jubail whereas members of the armed forces held an event in Riyadh to showcase the country's heritage and tradition.

References

Saudi Arabia
Public holidays
National days